Joseph Hilrick Barr (1868 – 13 September 1894) was a Scottish footballer who played as a defender for Burslem Port Vale, Accrington, Northwich Victoria, and Rotherham Town.

Career
Barr joined Burslem Port Vale from Elderslie in November 1889. He made his debut at right-back in a 2–2 draw with Chirk in a friendly match on 2 November. He became a regular in the team, and was a member of the side which shared the North Staffordshire Charity Challenge Cup in 1891. He joined Accrington in 1891. He later played for Northwich Victoria and Rotherham Town. He died in Droylsden on 13 September 1894 when he got entangled in a machine at work.

Career statistics
Source:

References

1868 births
1894 deaths
Footballers from Glasgow
Scottish footballers
Association football defenders
Port Vale F.C. players
Accrington F.C. players
Northwich Victoria F.C. players
Rotherham Town F.C. (1878) players
English Football League players
Accidental deaths in England
Industrial accident deaths